Neuron is one of the primary cell types in the nervous system.

Neuron may also refer to:
 Artificial neuron is the basic unit in an artificial neural network
 Neuron (synthesizer) is an electronic musical instrument
 The Dassault nEUROn is a planned stealth unmanned combat air vehicle designed by a consortium of European countries
 Neuron (journal) is a scientific journal publishing scholarly neuroscience articles
 Neuron (software) is a simulation environment used in computational neuroscience for modeling individual neurons and networks of neurons